Camillo Mastrocinque (11 May 1901 – 23 April 1969) was an Italian film director and screenwriter. He directed more than 60 films between 1937 and 1968, and is known to horror film fans for directing Terror in the Crypt (1964) starring Christopher Lee, and An Angel for Satan (1966) starring Barbara Steele.

Selected filmography

 Queen of the Scala (1937)
 I Want to Live with Letizia (1938)
 The Cuckoo Clock (1938)
 Don Pasquale (1940)
 The Last Dance (1941)
 Fedora (1942)
 A Living Statue (1943)
 Lost in the Dark (1947)
 Be Seeing You, Father (1948)
 The Fighting Men (1950)
 That Ghost of My Husband (1950)
 Anna's Sin (1952)
 Toto in Hell (1955)
 Are We Men or Corporals? (1955)
 Toto, Peppino, and the Hussy (1956)
 Toto, Peppino and the Outlaws (1956)
 The Band of Honest Men (1956)
 Totò lascia o raddoppia? (1956)
 The Lady Doctor (1957)
 The Beautiful Legs of Sabrina (1958)
 Toto in Paris (1958)
 Men and Noblemen (1959)
 Winter Holidays (1959)
 La cambiale (1959)
 Tough Guys (1960)
 Totòtruffa 62 (1961)
 Eighteen in the Sun (1962)
 Gli eroi del doppio gioco (1962)
 The Motorized (1962)
 The Swindlers (1963)
 Terror in the Crypt (1964)
 Te lo leggo negli occhi (1965)
 An Angel for Satan (1966)
 The Most Beautiful Couple in the World (1968)

References

External links

1901 births
1969 deaths
Italian film directors
Italian male screenwriters
Writers from Rome
20th-century Italian screenwriters
20th-century Italian male writers